John Dickerson may refer to:
John Dickerson (journalist) (born 1968), American journalist
John J. Dickerson (1900–1966), Republican politician from New Jersey
John Dickerson (trainer) (1863–1944), horse trainer
John S. Dickerson (born 1982), American  evangelical Christian pastor and journalist

See also
John Dickson (disambiguation)